A Happy Seeder is a no-till planter, towed behind a tractor, that sows (plants) seeds in rows directly without any prior seedbed preparation. It is operated with the PTO of the tractor and is connected to it with three-point linkage. It consists of a straw managing chopper and a zero till drill that makes it possible to sow new crop in the residue of the previous crop. Flail type straight blades are mounted on the straw management rotor that chops the stubbles that comes in contact with the sowing tine. It deposits the residue of the previous crop over the sown field as mulch. Mainly, it is used to sow wheat after the paddy harvest in North India.

Background 
Happy seeder is a proposed solution for stubble management after harvesting of the paddy crops. It is similar to a zero till ferti seed drill developed by National Agro Industries.

Usually, many farmers in Punjab and Haryana burn stubble, which has a severe socioeconomic and environmental impact on the North Indian regions. Paddy stubble burning results in large emissions of greenhouse gases such as carbon dioxide (CO2), carbon monoxide (CO), nitrogen oxides (NOx), and methane (CH4) as well as particulate matter (PM10 and PM2.5).

Issues 
 Many farmers are reluctant to use happy seeder even when the government is offering up to 50% to 80% subsidy.
 Some farmers complain that happy seeder is not an efficient machine to manage stubbles and leaves behind many particles, which are not ploughed back into the field. Thus, creating a problem in sowing and germination for the wheat crop.
 For happy seeder to do its work efficiently, a SUPER SMS (Super Straw Management System) is needed while harvesting paddy, which cuts and spreads the residue evenly on the field.

Benefits 
 Protects soil moisture due to increased filtration and low evaporation.
 It regulates its temperature and contributes to the control of extremes of heat and radiation, improving the microclimate of the soil.
 Protects the soil structure.
 It does not interrupt natural drains.
 Control soil erosion.
 It increases its fertility, reducing the rate of decomposition of organic matter and therefore the loss of carbon.

References 

Agricultural machinery
Agriculture in India